František Udržal (3 January 1866 in Dolní Roveň, Kingdom of Bohemia – 25 April 1938 in Prague) was a Czechoslovak politician. 

A member and leader of the powerful Agrarian Party, his political career started as member of the local Diet of Bohemia, then of parliament of Austria-Hungary, then of parliament of Czechoslovakia. He served seven years as minister of defense and four years as prime minister of Czechoslovakia (1 February 1929 – 24 October 1932) in two periods (1 February 1929 – 7 December 1929 and 7 December 1929 – 29 October 1932).

See also
History of Czechoslovakia
List of prime ministers of Czechoslovakia

External links
Transcript from parliament with his short bio 
 

1866 births
1938 deaths
People from Pardubice District
People from the Kingdom of Bohemia
Young Czech Party politicians
Republican Party of Farmers and Peasants politicians
Prime Ministers of Czechoslovakia
Government ministers of Czechoslovakia
Members of the Austrian House of Deputies (1897–1900)
Members of the Austrian House of Deputies (1901–1907)
Members of the Austrian House of Deputies (1907–1911)
Members of the Austrian House of Deputies (1911–1918)
Members of the Bohemian Diet
Members of the Revolutionary National Assembly of Czechoslovakia
Members of the Chamber of Deputies of Czechoslovakia (1920–1925)
Members of the Chamber of Deputies of Czechoslovakia (1925–1929)
Members of the Chamber of Deputies of Czechoslovakia (1929–1935)
Members of the Senate of Czechoslovakia (1935–1939)